Maulana Azhar (died 1475) was a  Persian calligrapher. 

Azhar was trained by Jafar Tabrizi and worked for Shah Rukh in the Timurid court. His calligraphy primarily used the Nastaʿlīq script.

References

Iranian calligraphers
1475 deaths
Year of birth unknown
15th-century Iranian people
Scholars from the Timurid Empire